General Cook may refer to:

Donald G. Cook (born 1946), U.S. Air Force four-star general
Gilbert R. Cook (1889–1963), U.S. Army major general
Henry Cook (aviator) (fl. 1890s–1910s), Royal Artillery brigadier general
John Pope Cook (1825–1910), Union Army brigadier general and brevet major general
Orval R. Cook (1898–1980), U.S. Air Force four-star general
Philip Cook (general) (1817–1894), Confederate States Army brigadier general

See also
General Cooke (disambiguation)
Attorney General Cook (disambiguation)